This is a list of Iranian football transfers for the 2014–15 winter transfer window. Transfers of Iran Pro League is listed. 
Transfer window opens on 1 December 2014 and closes on 28 December. On 27 December Transfer deadline for players who contracted with Iranian clubs extended til 30 December 2014.

Rules and regulations 
The Iranian Football Clubs who participate in 2014–15 Iran Pro League are allowed to have up to maximum 35 players (including up to maximum 4 non-Iranian players) in their player lists, which will be categorized in the following groups:
 Up to maximum 18 adult (without any age limit) players
 Up to maximum 9 under-23 players (i.e. the player whose birth is after 1 January 1992).
 Up to maximum 8 under-21 players (i.e. the player whose birth is after 1 January 1994).

According to Iran Football Federation rules for 2013-14 Football Season, each Football Club is allowed to take up to maximum 6 new  players . In addition to these six new players, each club is allowed to take up to maximum 4 non-Iranian new players (at least one of them should be Asian) and up to 3 players from Free agent (who did not play in 2013–14 Iran Pro League season or doesn't list in any 2014–15 League after season's start). After Conscription Scandal in Iranian Football, as compensation for clubs that damaged in this progress the clubs allowed to add more players such that for each soldier they can add one extra player. Also Clubs that played in AFC champions League can add 5+1 foreigners instead of normal 3+1 quota.

Iran Pro League

Esteghlal 

In:

Out:

Esteghlal Khuzestan 

In:

Out:

Foolad 

In:

Out:

Gostaresh Foolad 

In:

Out:

Malavan 

In:

Out:

Naft Tehran 

In:

Out:

Naft Masjed Soleyman 

In:

Out:

Padideh 

In:

 

Out:

Paykan 

In:

Out:

Persepolis 

In:

Out:

Rah Ahan 

In:

Out:

Saba Qom 

In:

 

Out:

Saipa 

In:

Out:

Sepahan 

In:

Out:

Tractor Sazi 

In:

 

 

Out:

Zob Ahan 

In:

 
 

Out:

Notes and references

Football transfers winter 2014–15
2014
Transfers